Chester J. Rutecki (August 8, 1916 – August 3, 1976) was an American boxer who competed in the 1936 Summer Olympics.

He was born in Chicago.

In 1936 he was eliminated in the second round of the welterweight class after losing his fight to the upcoming gold medalist Sten Suvio.

External links
profile

1916 births
1976 deaths
Boxers from Chicago
Welterweight boxers
Olympic boxers of the United States
Boxers at the 1936 Summer Olympics
American people of Polish descent
American male boxers